The 1989 World Games were held in Karlsruhe, Germany. India competed at the 1989 World Games at Karlsruhe and won one Silver and one Bronze medals, both in Women's Powerlifting.

Medalists

References

1989
1989 in Indian sport
1989 World Games